Aq Bolagh (also Romanized as Āq Bolāgh; also known as Āqbolāq and Āq Bulāq) is a village in Chaharduli-ye Sharqi Rural District, Chaharduli District, Qorveh County, Kurdistan Province, Iran. At the 2006 census, its population was 486, in 117 families. The village is populated by Azerbaijanis.

References 

Towns and villages in Qorveh County
Azerbaijani settlements in Kurdistan Province